Dust of Dreams is the ninth volume of Canadian author Steven Erikson's epic fantasy series, the Malazan Book of the Fallen. It is the first book in the series to end on a cliffhanger, dealing with the fallout from Reaper's Gale and forms the first half of the series finale, with The Crippled God forming the second half, and being the tenth and final novel in the series.

Development
In a 2014 Q&A with Tor, Erikson says he considers Dust of Dreams to be the first half of a single, concluding book.

Plot
Dust of Dreams returns to the continent of Lether, last seen in Reaper's Gale. Adjunct Tavore leads the Malazan army into the Letherii Wastelands to fight against an unknown threat.

Critical Reception
Dust of Dreams received mixed reviews, largely because it was written as the first half of a single volume.

Bill Capossere says it is "in the top tier of a top-tier series", elaborating "it ends, unfortunately, with a cliffhanger, but Dust of Dreams leaves you wanting more."

SFFWorld says "n first read it does appear to be one of the weakest of the Malazan books" but clarifies the book feels incomplete without its sequel.

SF Site describes the series so far "is as complex and deep as any in fantasy or science fiction". Acknowledging the lack of conclusion, praise is given for the setup given for the final volume.

References

Malazan Book of the Fallen
Tor Books books
High fantasy novels
2009 Canadian novels
Novels by Steven Erikson
Bantam Books books